Rukla Eldership is a Lithuanian eldership, located in a southern part of Jonava District Municipality. As of 2020, administrative centre and largest settlement within eldership was Rukla.

Geography
 Rivers: Neris, Lankesa, Lomena;
 Forests: Gaižiūnai Forest;
 Protected areas: Lomena Landscape Sanctuary

79.03 % of Rukla eldership's whole area is covered in forests.

Populated places 
Following settlements are located in the Rukla Eldership (as for 2011 census):

Towns: Rukla
Villages: Jonalaukis, Kamšalai, Konstantinava, Rukla village, Tartokas, Venecija

Transport 
KK143 is the main road connecting settlements with Jonava.

Demography

References

Elderships in Jonava District Municipality